Sindang Station is a subway station on the Seoul Subway Line 2 and Line 6.

The Line 2 station is located in Sindang-dong, and the Line 6 station in Heungin-dong, both within Jung-gu of Seoul.

Vicinity
Exit 1 : Korea Workers' Compensation & Welfare Service
Exit 3 : Seongdong High School
Exit 6 : Heungin Elementary School
Exit 8 : Tteokbokki Town
Exit 9 : Chungmu Arts Hall
Exit 10 : Kwanghee Elementary School

Chungmu Arts Hall
Chungmu Arts Hall is an art center near Sindang station Entrance No.9 of Line 6. It is a multi-purpose cultural complex, with theatres and sports facilities, as well as art gallery and academy.

Sindang neighbourhood
The Sindang-dong neighbourhood, is found by turning at the first left coming from exit 8 and for approximately two blocks. It is a popular shopping area with a variety of food markets, and eateries that specialise in Korean snacks such as Tteokbokki. It is known to Koreans for its Tteokbokki Town.

References

Seoul Metropolitan Subway stations
Railway stations opened in 1983
Metro stations in Jung District, Seoul
1983 establishments in South Korea
20th-century architecture in South Korea